Sir Owen Trevor Jones (17December 19268September 2016) was a British Liberal Democrat politician and member of the Liverpool City Council.

Family
Jones was the son of Owen and Ada Jones of Dyserth, Denbighshire.
His wife, Lady Doreen Jones, is a former Lord Mayor of Liverpool.  He has a son, Glyn, and daughter, Louise, and three grandchildren, Thomas, George and Ayesha.  His daughter-in-law Mia Jones was a Liberal Democrat Councillor for Chester City Council and a candidate for Chester in the 2005 General Election.

Politics

Local politics
Jones was brought into politics in 1966 when a proposed ring road threatened the demolition of his chandlery business' warehouse.
He was elected to Liverpool City Council in 1968 and Liverpool Metropolitan District Council in 1973. He led the Liberal Party to control of Liverpool City Council in 1973.He became Deputy Leader and Chair of Housing in 1975, he then became Liberal group leader Bill Smyth lost his seat on the council. His deputy became David Alton who has been the Whip and he made Paul Mahon group Whip. He then had Mike Storey as his Deputy from 1980-1991. He served as Leader of the Council from 1978–83, From 1978/79 the Liberals had an alliance with the Conservatives. Due to party tensions in the council Labour chaired the majority of committees in 1979/80 but he won the vote to remain leader. He retired in 1991. In 2003 he returned to public service when he was elected again to Liverpool City Council, serving until 2010.

National politics 
Following his initial successes for the party in Liverpool, Jones took an interest in national politics. In 1972 he was elected President of the Liberal Party, serving a one-year term. During that year, he took a high profile in the parliamentary by-elections the party fought, overseeing four victories: Sutton and Cheam, Berwick-upon-Tweed, Ripon and Isle of Ely. At the February 1974 General Election he stood as Liberal candidate in Liverpool Toxteth and at the General Election later that year in October, he contested Gillingham. He was also heavily involved in the by-election win at Liverpool Edge Hill by David Alton in 1979 with a 36% swing.

He was knighted in 1981. Jones' favoured nickname was "Jones the Vote" in reference to his Welsh heritage.

He died on 8 September 2016 after suffering from cancer.

References

External links
Sir Trevor Jones: Guardian obituary
Liverpool Liberal Democrats

1926 births
2016 deaths
Liberal Democrats (UK) councillors
Councillors in Liverpool
Knights Bachelor
Presidents of the Liberal Party (UK)
Liberal Party (UK) councillors
Leaders of local authorities of England